Senegal is a coastal West African nation located 14 degrees north of the equator and 14 degrees west of the Prime Meridian. The country's total area is 196,190 km2 of which 192,000 km2 is land and 4,190 km2 is water.

70% of the population of Senegal lives in the Coastal Region. Because most of Senegal's population is on the coast, climate change is expected to displace larger parts of the population.

Physical features 
Senegal is bordered to the west by the North Atlantic Ocean. On land, the nation's longest border is with Mauritania to the north, an 813 km border along the Senegal River. To the east is the 419 km border with Mali. In the southeast is Guinea (330 km border) and to the south-southwest is Guinea-Bissau (338 km), both borders running along the Casamance River. Senegal is one of only a handful of countries to have a near-enclave within its borders—the small nation of the Gambia in the interior, which has a 740 km border with Senegal.

The Gambia penetrates more than 320 km into Senegal, from the Atlantic coast to the center of Senegal along the Gambia River, which bisects Senegal's territory. In total, Senegal has 2,640 km of land borders, and 531 km of coastline and shoreline. Senegal makes maritime claims of a  contiguous zone, a  territorial sea, and a  exclusive economic zone. It also claims a  continental shelf, or to the edge of the continental margin.

Another distinctive and well-known feature of the country is the pink-water Lake Retba, near the city of Dakar, which is one of the few lakes in the world with naturally pink or reddish coloured water.

The lowest point in Senegal is the Atlantic Ocean, at sea level.

Climate 
Tropical; hot, humid; rainy season (May to November) has strong southeast winds; dry season (December to April) dominated by hot, dry, harmattan wind.
Well-defined dry and humid seasons result from northeast winter winds and southwest summer winds. Dakar's annual rainfall of about  occurs between June and October when maximum temperatures average  and minimums ; December to February maximum temperatures average  and minimums .

Extremes in annual precipitation range from 250 mm (10 inches) in the extreme north, to 1800 mm (71 inches) in extreme southern coastal areas.

Examples

Climate change

Ecology 

Senegal has a number of vegetation zones: sahel, Sahel-Sudan, Sudan (region), Sudan-Guinea, tropical rainforest, and Guinean mangroves. Most of the southern Casamance arm of the country has been classified by the World Wildlife Fund as part of the Guinean forest-savanna mosaic ecoregion.

See also:.
Vegetation zones of Senegal 2
Vegetation zones of Senegal 3

CIA World Factbook 

Terrain:
generally low, rolling, plains rising to foothills in the southeast.

Natural resources:
fish, phosphates, iron ore

Land use:
arable land:
19.57%
permanent crops:
0.28%
other:
80.15% (2011)

Irrigated land:
1,197 km2 (2003)

Total renewable water resources:
38.8 km3

Natural hazards:
lowlands seasonally flooded; periodic droughts

Environment - current issues:
wildlife populations threatened by poaching; deforestation; overgrazing; soil erosion; desertification; overfishing

Senegal is a party to several environmental treaties:
Comprehensive Test Ban Treaty
Convention on Biological Diversity
Convention on Fishing and Conservation of Living Resources of the High Seas
Convention on the International Trade in Endangered Species of Wild Flora and Fauna
International Convention for the Regulation of Whaling
Montreal Protocol
United Nations Framework Convention on Climate Change
United Nations Convention to Combat Desertification
United Nations Convention on the Law of the Sea
Ramsar Convention
1978 Convention on Ship Pollution

Senegal has signed, but not ratified the Convention on Marine Dumping.

Extreme points 

This is a list of the extreme points of Senegal, the points that are farther north, south, east or west than any other location.

 Northernmost point – unnamed location on the border with Mauritania in the Senegal river immediately north-west of the town of Podor, Saint-Louis Region
 Easternmost point – unnamed location on the border with Mali near the confluence of the Balin-Ko river and the Falémé River, Kédougou Region
 Southernmost point – unnamed location on the border with Guinea immediately south of the village of Toile, Kédougou Region
 Westernmost point -  Pointe des Almadies, Cap Vert peninsula, Dakar Region*
 *Note: this is also the westernmost point of the mainland African continent

Gallery

References